The International Summit Council for Peace (ISCP) was launched in South Korea during the 2019 World Summit organized by the UPF with the aim of bringing together current and former heads of state. Among the speakers at the 2019 Summit were Cheney, former US vice president, Gingrich, former Speaker of the US House of Representatives, and many other politicians and statesmen. Among others, the former presidents of Albania, Ghana, Paraguay and other former presidents participated in the summit.  ISCP continues to work on the foundations of the World Peace Summit, established in 1987.

ISCP Distinguished Award 
At the inaugural meeting, ten prominent statesmen and politicians received the ISCP Distinguished Award:

 Dick Cheney, Vice President (2001-2009), USA
 Ousmane Moutari, Ambassador of Niger to the UN
 Tuiatua Efi, Head of State (2007-2017), Samoa
 Luis Franco, President (2012-2013), Paraguay
 Anthony Carmona, President (2013-2018), Trinidad and Tobago
 Stanislav Shushkevich, Chairman (1991-1994), Supreme Soviet, Belarus
 Alfred Moisiu, President (2002–2007), Albania
 Iakoba Taeia Italeli, Governor General of Tuvalu
 Evaristo Carvalho, President of São Tomé and Príncipe
 Jerry Rawlings, President (1981-2001), Ghana

International Summit Council for Peace ISCP-Africa 
Goodluck Jonathan, the former president of Nigeria, became the chairman of the ISCP-Africa Peace Council International Summit, which brings together former and current presidents of African countries.

At the inaugural meeting, nine prominent African statesmen and politicians received the ISCP Distinguished Award:

 Gwede Mantashe, Chairman of the African National Congress, ANC, representing president of South Africa
 Goodluck Jonathan, President (2010-2015), Nigeria
 Dioncounda Traoré, President (2012-2013), Mali
 Mahamane Ousmane, President (1993-1996), Niger
 Speciosa Kazibwe, Vice President (1994-2003), Uganda
 Kwassi Klutse, Prime Minister (1996-1999), Togo
 Clara Jesus, wife of Prime Minister of Sao Tome & Principe
 Alex Grant, Member of Parliament, representing President of Liberia
 Josiah Hungwe, Provincial Governor, representing President of Zimbabwe

Goodluck Jonathan, as the chairman of the International Peace Council of the African Union Summit (ISCP), spoke in 2019 at the International Leadership Conference in Johannesburg, South Africa.

At the gathering, it was said that democratic elections in Africa should be transparent and democratic, for the benefit of all the people of Africa.

At the Sao Tome Peace Summit 2019, it was said that the goals of the International Summit of the Peace Council (ISCP) are to strengthen democracy, peace and stability by supporting the youth of Africa.

The former president of Nigeria, Goodluck Jonathan, at the 2020 world summit in South Korea, led the session of the International Summit Council for Peace (ISCP), where former and current heads of governments discussed current problems in the world.

In its activities, the International Summit for Peace (ISCP)-Africa supported African leaders in the fight against the spread of the COVID-19 pandemic. They called on the international community to help the African people in the fight against COVID-19 and send medical equipment, and they also called on local and international organizations to cooperate in the fight against COVID-19, especially in Africa.

Asia-Pacific Summit 2019 and the International Summit Council for Peace Council (ISCP) in 2022 
Cambodian Prime Minister Hun Sen, together with other world leaders, signed the Resolution on the Establishment of the International Summit Peace Council (ISCP), during a ceremony at the second Asia-Pacific Summit 2019 in Phnom Penh, Cambodia.

The Prime Minister of Cambodia, Hun Sen, delivered the keynote speech at the International Summit Council for Peace Council (ISCP) in 2022. Hun Sen proposed that the two Koreas should begin to cooperate through UNESCO, to cooperate culturally and to change the demilitarized zone into a zone of peace.

He proposed the initiative: "Two states towards one nation, one culture and people", based on the vision of the Universal Peace Federation.

References 

Peace organizations